Fairfax Stone Historical Monument State Park is a West Virginia state park commemorating the Fairfax Stone, a surveyor's marker and boundary stone at the source of the North Branch of the Potomac River. The original stone was placed on October 23, 1746 to settle a boundary dispute between Thomas Fairfax, 6th Lord Fairfax of Cameron and the English Privy Council concerning the Northern Neck of Virginia. It determined the proprietorship and boundaries of a large tract of mostly unsurveyed land in the English colonies of Maryland and Virginia.

Park

Fairfax Stone Historical Monument, part of a four-acre West Virginia state park, is six miles north of Thomas, West Virginia. The site is sparsely developed, lacking any buildings or restroom facilities.

History

The exact boundaries of the "Northern Neck Land Grant" (later called the "Fairfax Grant") had been undetermined since it was first contrived in 1649 by the then-exiled King Charles II.
John Savage and his survey party had located the site of the source of the North Branch of the Potomac River (the northern boundary of the tract) in 1736, but had made no attempt to establish the western boundaries.
In 1748, George Washington, along with frontiersman and noted surveyor David Morgan of Virginia, had surveyed the area again. Their job was to establish the northernmost boundary of Lord Fairfax's land and estate, on the present day borders of Maryland and West Virginia. They would be the ones to place the Fairfax Stone where it is today for a consummation of their hard work.
The North Branch of the Potomac River initially heads west from its source at the Fairfax Stone before curving north and then generally flowing east toward Chesapeake Bay.  For this reason, the Stone is only a county corner of West Virginia counties rather than part of the state's border with Maryland, an issue that was only resolved when the Supreme Court ruled against Maryland in 1910 in Maryland v. West Virginia, determining that Maryland would only go westward up the Potomac far enough to meet a point where a line north from the Fairfax Stone would cross that branch of the Potomac. Until the ruling, the boundary of Maryland was indeterminate.  Three West Virginia counties—Grant, Preston and Tucker— share the boundary marked by the Fairfax Stone (West Virginia having seceded from Virginia during the American Civil War).

Fate of the original stone

The original Fairfax Stone, in accordance with common surveying practices of the era, was most likely simply a natural, unmarked rock selected from among the outcroppings in the area. Legal boundary disputes between Maryland and Virginia caused the latter to relocate the stone in 1833 after the site had been lost to memory. The stone was still intact in 1859 when one Lieutenant Melcher found it again and reran the "Fairfax Line" on behalf of the two states. The Stone was gone by 1909, however, having been carried away by vandals. There have been six Fairfax Stones, each one replacing the last owing to weathering or vandalism. The current stone is a six-ton rock with a flat face, on which is inlaid a historical plaque detailing the stone's significance. Next to it is the 1910 stone.  The present six-ton Fairfax Stone was dedicated on October 5, 1957.

Plaque legend

See also
List of West Virginia state parks

References

External links

 
 History of the Fairfax Line from surveyhistory.org
 Proceedings of the Council of Maryland, 1753-1761 from the Maryland State Archives
 "US SCt Deakins Line Stone 33, 1910, Maryland - West Virginia" from waymarking.com
 The Fairfax Stone and West Virginia v. Maryland from The Traveling 219 project.

 Fairfax Stone
Geography of Maryland
Geography of West Virginia
Pre-statehood history of Maryland
Colony of Virginia
History of West Virginia
Landmarks in West Virginia
State parks of West Virginia
Protected areas of Grant County, West Virginia
Protected areas of Preston County, West Virginia
Protected areas of Tucker County, West Virginia
Protected areas established in 1957
Potomac River
National Register of Historic Places in Grant County, West Virginia
Monuments and memorials on the National Register of Historic Places in West Virginia
National Register of Historic Places in Preston County, West Virginia
Historic surveying landmarks in the United States
National Register of Historic Places in Tucker County, West Virginia
1957 establishments in West Virginia
IUCN Category III